

Heads up may refer to:

Art, entertainment, and media

Film  
 Heads Up (1930 film), an American film directed by Victor Schertzinger
 Heads Up (1925 film), an American silent comedy adventure film

Games
 Heads up poker, a poker term for play against a single opponent
 Heads Up, Seven Up, a traditional children's game

Music

Groups and labels
 Heads Up International, a jazz and African music label

Albums and EPs
 Heads Up (Bassnectar EP), a 2009 EP by American electronic music artist Bassnectar
Heads Up (David Newman album), 1987
 Heads Up (Death from Above 1979 EP), the 2002 debut recording from the band Death from Above 1979
 Heads Up (The Stems album), a 2007 album by The Stems
 Heads Up (Warpaint album), a 2016 album by Warpaint
 Heads Up! (album), a 1967 album by jazz trumpeter Blue Mitchell

Songs
 "Heads Up", a song from True & Livin' (2005) by Zion I
"Heads Up", a song from the iTunes release of Icona Pop (2012) by Icona Pop

Stage productions
Heads Up!, a 1929 Broadway musical by Rodgers and Hart

Television
 Heads Up! (TV series), a 2006 Canadian educational television show which is produced and broadcast by TVOntario
 Heads Up! (game show), a 2016 American game show based on the video game app from The Ellen DeGeneres Show
 Heads Up, a local kid's game show that was produced & aired on WBAL-TV in Baltimore, MD
 "Heads Up" (The Walking Dead), the seventh episode of the sixth season of the post-apocalyptic drama series The Walking Dead

Video games 
 Heads Up (video game), a video game produced for the Vectrex game console
 Heads Up!, a video game created by The Ellen DeGeneres Show

Other uses 
 Head-up display or heads-up display, a transparent display that presents data without obstructing the user's view of objects behind it